PICTIVE (Plastic Interface for Collaborative Technology Initiative through Video Exploration) is a participatory design method used to develop graphical user interfaces. 

It was developed at Bellcore around 1990.

External links 
A Closer Look at Pictive: a participatory design technique Prof. Meg Murray

Usability
Human–computer interaction